The 2000 election of the Speaker of the House of Commons  occurred on 23 October 2000 following the retirement of Betty Boothroyd as Speaker. The election resulted in the election of Labour MP Michael Martin, who had served as Deputy Speaker since 1997.  It was the first contested election since 27 April 1992.

Candidates

Nominated candidates
The following candidates were successfully nominated and called in the following order, which was decided at the 'discretion' of Edward Heath the chair of the session:

Candidate who withdrew
 John Butterfill (Conservative)

Election
This was the last Speaker election to be conducted by means of a conventional parliamentary motion with recorded votes on an amendment for each candidate. With an unusually large number of candidates, a significant number of MPs spoke in favour of switching to a less time-consuming procedure, but Sir Edward Heath, who was presiding in his capacity as Father of the House, declined to allow a vote on this issue.

The repeated ballots took nearly six hours. Each candidate gave their own speech of submission to the will of the House, having each been nominated and seconded by Members in separate speeches.  Martin was the front runner going into the ballot and was never in any danger of losing during the election, winning every ballot by at least 76 votes.

As a result of this election, the rules for electing a Speaker were changed the following year to a use a secret and exhaustive ballot. This procedure was first used in the Speaker election of 2009.

Results

Under the old system for electing Speakers of the House of Commons, a candidate would be nominated and seconded, and alternative candidates would be offered as 'amendments' to that initial motion. In 2000, 11 candidates stepped forward, leading Sir Edward Heath, presiding in his capacity as Father of the House, to have the candidates voted on two at a time. He called Michael Martin to be nominated first. In the event, no candidate was able to surpass Martin in any of the ballots, and once all Martin's opponents had been eliminated from the contest, the original motion that he be elected Speaker was met with some audible opposition.  A division was therefore held, but the motion was approved by 370 votes to 8. Martin was thus elected Speaker.

References

External links
 House of Commons transcript, 23 October 2000
 C-Span video featuring part of the election proceedings: http://www.c-span.org/video/?160478-1/election-speaker

2000 elections in the United Kingdom
2000
October 2000 events in the United Kingdom